I Do Believe may refer to:
I Do Believe, an album from Gaither Vocal Band discography
I Do Believe (Tha Feelstyle song), 2006
I Do Believe (The Highwaymen song), 1995
"I Do Believe", song and single by Kid Creole and the Coconuts from 2011 album I Wake Up Screaming
"I Do Believe", song by Clyde McPhatter, B-side of "Maybe", 1962
"I Do Believe (I Fell in Love)", song by Donna Summer, B-side of "She Works Hard for the Money" 1983